Binary economics, also known as two-factor economics, is a theory of economics that endorses both private property and a free market but proposes significant reforms to the banking system.

Louis Kelso theorized that widespread use of central bank-issued, interest-free loans to fund employee-owned firms could simultaneously finance economic growth and widen stock ownership in a way which binary economists believe would be non-inflationary.

The term "binary" derived from its heterodox treatment of labor and capital (but not in the sense of binary opposition). Kelso claimed that in a truly free market wages would tend to fall over time, with all the benefits of technological progress accruing to capital owners.

Overview
Binary economics rejects the claim that neoclassical economics alone promotes a 'free market' which is free, fair and efficient. (e.g., as an interpretation of the classical First Fundamental Theorem of Welfare Economics). Binary economists believe freedom is only truly achieved if all individuals are able to acquire an independent economic base from capital holdings, and that the distribution of ownership rights can "deepen democracy".

Binary economics argues financial savings prior to investment are not required on the basis that the present money supply is mostly created credit anyway. It argues that newly minted money invested on behalf of those without access to existing cash savings or collateral can be adequately repaid through the returns on those investments, which need not be inflationary if the economy is operating below capacity. The theory asserts that what matters is whether the newly created money is interest-free, whether it can be repaid, whether there is effective collateral and whether it goes towards the development and spreading of various forms of productive (and the associated consuming) capacity.

Another contrast is that, in evidence-based economics, interest (as distinct from administration cost) is practically always necessary; in Binary Economics theory it isn't (not in relation to the development and spreading of productive capacity). Conventional economics accounts for the observed time value of money, whereas binary economics does not.

Background 
The theory behind Binary Economics was proposed by American lawyer Louis Kelso and philosopher Mortimer Adler in their book The Capitalist Manifesto (1958). The book's title could be seen as a Cold War reference in opposition to communism.

Kelso and Adler elaborated on their proposals in The New Capitalists in 1961. Then Kelso worked with political scientist Patricia Hetter Kelso to further explain how capital instruments provide an increasing percentage of the wealth and why capital is narrowly owned in the modern industrial economy. Their analysis predicted that widely distributed capital ownership will create a more balanced economy. Kelso and Hetter proposed new "binary" share holdings which would pay out full net earnings as dividends (with exceptions for research, maintenance and depreciation). These could be obtained on credit by those not possessing savings, with a government-backed insurance scheme to protect the shareholder in the event of loss.

Kelso's writings were not well received by academic economists. Milton Friedman said of The Capitalist Manifesto "the book's economics was bad ... the interpretation of history, ludicrous; and the policy recommended, dangerous" and recalls a debate where even the moderator Clark Kerr "lost his cool as a moderator and attacked [Kelso's arguments] vigorously". Paul Samuelson, another Nobel Memorial Prize in Economic Sciences winner, told the U.S. Congress that Kelso's theories were a "cranky fad" not accepted by mainstream economists, but Kelso's ideas on promoting wider capital ownership nevertheless significantly influenced the passing of legislation promoting employee ownership.

Aims and programme
The aim of binary economics is to ensure that all individuals receive income from their own independent capital estate, using interest-free loans issued by a central bank to promote the spread of employee-owned firms. These loans are intended to: halve infrastructure improvement costs, reduce business startup costs, and widen stock ownership.

Binary economics is not mainstream and does not fit easy into the left–right spectrum. It has variously been characterized as an extreme right-wing ideology and as extremely left-wing by its critics. The 'binary' (in 'binary economics') means 'composed of two' because it suffices to view the physical factors of production as being but two (labour and capital (which includes land). It recognises only two ways of genuinely earning a living − by labour and by productive capital ownership. In its theory humans own their labour, but also productive capital.

Binary economics is partly based on belief that society has an absolute duty to ensure that all humans have good health, housing, education and an independent income, as well as a responsibility to protect the environment for its own sake.  The interest-free loans proposed by binary economics are compatible with the traditional opposition of the Abrahamic religions to usury.

Proponents of binary economics claim that their system contains no expropriation of wealth, and much less redistribution will be necessary. They argue that it cannot cause inflation and is of particular importance as more of the physical contribution to production is automated. and that the Binary economics paradigm is particularly helpful in addressing the issue of why developing countries languish.  Advocates contend that implementing their system will lessen national debt and encourage national unity. They believe binary economics could create a stable economy.

Productiveness vs. productivity 
Binary productiveness is distinctly different from the conventional economic concept of productivity. Binary productiveness attempts to quantify the proportion of output contributed by total labor input and total capital input respectively, Adding capital inputs to a production process increases labor productivity, but binary economic theory argues that it decreases labor productiveness (i.e. the proportion of the total output with the support of both labor and capital that the labor inputs could have produced alone). For example, if the invention of a shovel allows a laborer to dig a hole in quarter of the time it would take him without the spade, binary economists would consider 75% of the "productiveness" to come from the shovel and only 25% from the laborer.

Roth criticised the shovel example on the basis that the shovel is not a factor of production independent of human capital because somebody invented it, and the shovel cannot act independently: the physical productiveness of the shovel before labour is added to it is zero.

Kelso used the concept of productiveness to support his theory of distributive justice, arguing that as capital increasingly substitutes for labor: "workers can legitimately claim from their aggregate labor only a decreasing percentage of total output", implying they would need to acquire capital holdings to maintain their level of income. In The Capitalist Manifesto, Kelso boldly asserted:
"It is, if anything an underestimation rather than an exaggeration to say that the aggregate physical contribution to the production of the wealth of the workers in the United States today accounts for less than 10 percent of the wealth produced, and that the contribution by the owners of capital instruments, through their physical instruments, accounts in physical terms for more than 90 percent of the wealth produced"

Whilst the increased importance of capital as a factor of production following the Industrial Revolution has long been accepted even by those believing economic value derives from labour such as Marx, Kelso's figures suggesting that value was created almost entirely by capital were dismissed by academic economists like Paul Samuelson. Samuelson asserted that Kelso's had not used any econometric analysis to arrive at his figures, which completely contradicted economists' empirical findings on the contribution of labour. The Capitalist Manifesto did not provide detailed calculations to support Kelso's claim, although a footnote suggested that it was based on a simple comparison with 1850s labour productivity figures.

Employee stock ownership plan (ESOPs) and other plans
Employee stock ownership plans (ESOPs) are compatible with some of the principles of binary economics. These stem originally from Louis Kelso & Patricia Hetter Kelso (1967)Two-Factor Theory: The Economics of Reality; the founding of Kelso & Company in 1970; and then from conversations in the early 1970s between Louis Kelso, Norman Kurland (Center for Economic and Social Justice), Senator Russell Long of Louisiana (Chairman, USA Senate Finance Committee, 1966–81) and Senator Mike Gravel of Alaska. There are about 11,500 ESOPs in the USA today covering 11 million employees in closely held companies.

Uses of central bank-issued interest-free loans
Binary economics proposes that central bank-issued interest-free loans should be administered by the banking system for the development and spreading of productive (and the associated consuming) capacity, particularly new capacity, as well as for environmental and public capital. While no interest would be charged, there would be an administrative cost as well as collateralization or capital credit insurance.

Proponents of binary economics are dissatisfied with fractional-reserve banking, arguing that it "creates new money out of nothing". The supply of interest-free loans would place in circumstances of a move (over time) towards banks maintaining reserves equal to 100% of their deposits; in practice, the large-scale interest-free lending desired by binary economics is compatible with the widespread reduction in money supply that would be caused by increased reserve requirements only if the government takes over the banks' role in credit creation.

Investments eligible for interest-free loans 
Binary economics suggests that ownership of productive (and the associated consuming) capacity, particularly new capacity, could be spread by the use of central bank-issued interest-free loans. Interest-free loans should be allowed for private capital investment IF such investment creates new owners of capital and is part of national policy to enable all individuals, over time, on market principles, to become owners of substantial amounts of productive, income-producing capital. By using central bank-issued interest-free loans, a large corporation would get cheap money as long as new binary shareholders are created.

References

Sources
Albus, James S. (1976) Peoples' Capitalism - The Economics of The Robot Revolution.
Ashford, Robert & Shakespeare, Rodney (1999) Binary Economics - the new paradigm.
Ashford, Robert "Louis Kelso’s Binary Economy" (The Journal of Socio-Economics, vol. 25, 1996).
el-Diwany, Tarek (2003) The Problem With Interest.
Gates, Jeff (1999) The Ownership Solution.
Gates, Jeff (2000) Democracy At Risk.
Gauche, Jerry "Binary Modes for the Privatization of Public Assets" (The Journal of Socio-Economics. Vol. 27, 1998).
Greenfield, Sidney M. Making Another World Possible: the Torah, Louis Kelso and the Problem of Poverty (paper given at conference, Columbia University, May, 2006).
Kelso, Louis & Kelso, Patricia Hetter (1986 & 1991), Democracy and Economic Power - Extending the ESOP Revolution through Binary Economics.
Kelso, Louis & Adler, Mortimer (1958), The Capitalist Manifesto.
Kelso, Louis & Adler, Mortimer (1961), The New Capitalists.
Kelso, Louis & Hetter, Patricia (1967), Two-Factor Theory: the Economics of Reality.
Kurland, Norman A New Look at Prices and Money: The Kelsonian Binary Model for Achieving Rapid Growth Without Inflation.
Kurland, Norman; Brohawn, Dawn & Michael Greaney (2004) Capital Homesteading for Every Citizen: A Just Free Market Solution for Saving Social Security.
Miller, J.H. ed., (1994), Curing World Poverty: The New Role of Property.
Reiners, Mark Douglas, The Binary Alternative and Future of Capitalism.
Schmid, A. Allan,(1984), “Broadening Capital Ownership: The Credit System as a Focus of Power", in Gar Alperovitz and Roger Skurski,eds. American Economic Policy, University of Notre Dame Press.
Shakespeare, Rodney & Challen, Peter (2002) Seven Steps to Justice.
Shakespeare, Rodney (2007) The Modern Universal Paradigm.
Turnbull, Shann (2001) The Use of Central Banks to Spread Ownership.
Turnbull, Shann (1975/2000), Democratising the Wealth of Nations.

External links
 Binary Economics now

Macroeconomic theories
Schools of economic thought
Monetary reform